Kin of IRRE-like protein 2, also known as NEPH3, is a protein that in humans is encoded by the KIRREL2 gene. It is primarily expressed in β cells of the pancreatic islets.

KIRREL2 is a member of the NEPH protein family, which includes NEPH1 (KIRREL) and NEPH2 (KIRREL3). NEPH proteins bind the

References

Further reading